Samuel Reed Clark was a member of the Wisconsin State Assembly representing Waushara County, Wisconsin in 1878, 1879 and 1885. Initially serving as a Republican, he later became an Independent. He was born on July 15, 1826, in Gorham, New York.

References

People from Gorham, New York
Wisconsin Independents
1826 births
Year of death missing
Republican Party members of the Wisconsin State Assembly